Jermyn, known as "The Birthplace of First Aid in America", is a borough which is located in Lackawanna County, Pennsylvania, United States.

In 1900, the population was 2,567, much of it attracted by the prospects of finding work at a large anthracite coal site in the region. Coal mines, cut glass works, silk, powder, grist, planing, sawmills, bottling works, and fertilizer factories dotted the borough during the early years of the twentieth century.  

By the time of the 2020 census, the population had declined to 2,156.

Jermyn is prsently the mailing address of the Lakeland School District. East Jermyn, the section of town east of the Lackawanna River and west of the small section of Archbald known as "Nebraska", is commonly referred to as "Calico Lane" or "The Lane".

History
The borough originally named Gibsonburg, was named for John Jermyn, a businessperson in the mining industry.

Jermyn was incorporated as a borough in 1870 and celebrated its centennial in 1970 with a week-long celebration.

Geography
Jermyn is located at  (41.527806, -75.547147).

Demographics

As of the census of 2010, there were 2,169 people, 951 households, and 581 families residing in the borough.

The population density was 2,711.3 people per square mile (1,046.8/km²). There were 1,017 housing units at an average density of 1,271.3 per square mile (496.6/km²).

The racial makeup of the borough was 96.8% White, 1.1% African American, 0.3% Native American, 0.4% Asian, 0.6% from other races, and 0.8% from two or more races. Hispanic or Latino of any race were 2.1% of the population.

There were 951 households, out of which 24.1% had children under the age of eighteen living with them; 43% were married couples living together, 13.6% had a female householder with no husband present, and 38.9% were non-families. 32.3% of all households were made up of individuals, and 11.6% had someone living alone who was sixty-five years of age or older. The average household size was 2.27 and the average family size was 2.87.

In the borough the population was spread out, with 20.4% under the age of eighteen, 61.7% from eighteen to sixty-four, and 17.9% who were sixty-five years of age or older. The median age was forty-two years.

The median income for a household in the borough was $32,824, and the median income for a family was $39,740. Males had a median income of $29,063 compared with that of $23,580 for females. 

The per capita income for the borough was $17,417. 

Roughly 8.9% of families and 12.7% of the population were living below the poverty line, including 19.3% of those who were under the age of eighteen and 13.4% of those who were aged sixty-five or older.

References

External links
 
 Article about Jermyn's role as the Birthplace of First Aid

Populated places established in 1870
Boroughs in Lackawanna County, Pennsylvania
1870 establishments in Pennsylvania